The Presbyterian Church in the Republic of Korea or the KiJang Presbyterian Church is an ecumenically-minded Presbyterian denomination in South Korea.

History 
The Presbyterian Church in Korea was established in 1902. In 1912 the first General Assembly was held. Australian, American, Canadian minister came in increasing number to Korea. During the Japanese occupation the church faced several hardships. The Pyungyang Seminary was forced to close its dors in 1938. Some leaders went into exile. One year later Chosun Seminary was opened in the south, this become the nucleus of KiJang. In contrast with the Pyungyang Seminary the Chosun Seminary adopted a progressive theological line. In 1946 the Presbyterian Church of Korea adopted the Chosun Seminary. The President of the Seminary Dr. Kim Jae-Joon published an essay that caused a violent debate between conservatives and progressive theological positions. Dr. Park Hyung-Ryong decided to leave the seminary he was followed by 51 students in 1947. The Assembly also recognised this new Seminary. Now there were two competing seminaries under the authority of the General assembly. The Assembly urged to unite these 2 seminaries. Later it became obvious to the Assembly that the theological position of Chosun Seminary could not be tolerated. In 1953 the church faced theological hardships, because of theology, methods and biblical study taught in the Chosun Theological Seminary. The conservative and fundamentalist fraction of the church rejected this teachings. The Presbyterians divided in 1953 to the Presbyterian Church in Korea and the Presbyterian Church in the Republic of Korea.
The Presbyterian Church in the Republic of Korea was the first denomination ordain women into the ministry in 1956, women allowed to be elders, and in 1974 the denomination had women pastors. In 1998 a woman became the vice-moderator.

Statistics 
In 2004 there were 326,000 members and 801 congregations with 631 ordained ministers in 10 Presbyteries.

It had 335,000 members in almost 1,000 congregations and 830 pastors in 2006.

Theology 
Member of the World Communion of Reformed Churches.
It affirms the Westminster Confession of Faith, the Westminster Larger Catechism and Westminster Shorter Catechism.

Sister Church relations established with :
Church of Scotland
United Protestant Church of France
Swiss Reformed Church
United Church of Canada

References

External links 
Official website 한국기독교장로회총회

Members of the World Communion of Reformed Churches
Presbyterian denominations in South Korea
Christian organizations established in 1953